Erich Förste (11 February 1892 – 10 July 1963) was a German naval officer who served in the Kaiserliche Marine, the Reichsmarine and the Kriegsmarine, eventually reaching the rank of Admiral during World War II.

Awards
 Iron Cross (1914) 2nd and 1st Class
 U-boat War Badge (1918)
 Wound Badge in Black
 Knight's Cross of the Albert Order 2nd Class with Swords
 Clasp to the Iron Cross (1939) 2nd and 1st Class
 German Cross in Gold on 25 May 1943 as Vizeadmiral and commanding admiral Aegean Sea

References

Citations

Bibliography

 

1892 births
1963 deaths
Military personnel  from Magdeburg
Imperial German Navy personnel of World War I
Admirals of the Kriegsmarine
Recipients of the Gold German Cross
U-boat commanders (Imperial German Navy)